List of Provinces of Japan > Nankaido > Iyo Province > Kazahaya District

 was a district located in central Iyo Province(Ehime Prefecture).

Timeline 
December 15, 1889 - Due to the Municipal Status enforcement, the following villages were formed.(10 villages)
Awai, Kōno, Asanami, Nanba, Tateiwa, Masaoka, Hōjō(city of Hōjō→city of Matsuyama)
Gomyō(city of Matsuyama)
Mutsuno, Higashinakajima, Nishinakajima, Jinwa(town of Nakajima→city of Matsuyama)
April 1, 1897 - The district merged with Onsen, Kume and Wake Districts to form Onsen District and the district dissolved.

Kasahaya District